Bytes is the debut studio album by English electronic music group The Black Dog, credited under the name Black Dog Productions. It was released on Warp on 8 March 1993. The album consists of tracks produced by the members of the group – Ed Handley, Andy Turner, and Ken Downie – under various aliases, including Plaid, Close Up Over, Xeper, Atypic, I.A.O., Discordian Popes and Balil. Black Dog Productions is also the name of their own record label.

In 2002, Slant Magazine placed Bytes at number 23 on its list of "The 25 Greatest Electronic Albums of the 20th Century". It has been cited as a landmark album of intelligent dance music.

Background
Bytes was released on the Sheffield techno label Warp in 1993 on double vinyl, cassette and CD. The members of The Black Dog collaborated on the album under various guises and combinations. An early version of "Clan (Mongol Hordes)" appears on Artificial Intelligence as "The Clan".

Track listing

References

External links
 
 Bytes at Warp

1993 debut albums
The Black Dog (band) albums
Warp (record label) albums
Albums with cover art by The Designers Republic